Marta Artigas (born 11 June 1968) is a Spanish gymnast. She competed in six events at the 1984 Summer Olympics.

References

External links
 

1968 births
Living people
Spanish female artistic gymnasts
Olympic gymnasts of Spain
Gymnasts at the 1984 Summer Olympics
Gymnasts from Barcelona
20th-century Spanish women